Thospia feminella is a species of snout moth in the genus Thospia. It was described by Roesler in 1973. It is found in Afghanistan.

References

Moths described in 1973
Phycitini